Jádésinmi or Jádésinmi is a male Yoruba given name and also a family name, meaning "let the crown rest." The name Notable people with the given name include:

 Amy Jadesimi 
 Oladipo Jadesimi

References